Eli Sheldon Glover (August 14, 1844 – May 29, 1920) was an artist and publisher of perspective maps, including maps of cities in the Midwestern and Western United States and Canada. Glover was active in San Francisco, Chicago, and Tacoma. He was also an inventor, and he wrote The Diary of Eli Sheldon Glover.

Glover established the Merchants Lithographing Company in Chicago. The company was destroyed by the Great Chicago Fire in 1871. Later in his career, he designed and manufactured a prospector's drill for use in Alaska. He also made elevation views of the business districts of San Francisco and Oakland. In addition, Glover had a binder and notebook business.

The Library of Congress includes some of his work in its collection. The Oregon Historical Society has a collection of his papers, which is available online through Orbis Cascade West.

Gallery

References

Further reading
Diary of Eli Sheldon Glover by Eli Sheldon Glover (Reprint Edition) , 

1844 births
1920 deaths
American male artists
19th-century American inventors